Akigumo  was one of 19 s built for the Imperial Japanese Navy during the 1930s.

Design and description
The Kagerō class was an enlarged and improved version of the preceding . Their crew numbered 240 officers and enlisted men. The ships had two Kampon geared steam turbines, each driving one propeller shaft, using steam provided by three Kampon water-tube boilers.

The main armament of the Kagerō class consisted of six  Type 3 guns in three twin-gun turrets, one superfiring pair aft and one turret forward of the superstructure. They were built with four  Type 96 anti-aircraft guns in two twin-gun mounts, but more of these guns were added over the course of the war. The ships were also armed with eight  torpedo tubes for the oxygen-fueled Type 93 "Long Lance" torpedo in two quadruple traversing mounts; one reload was carried for each tube. Their anti-submarine weapons comprised 16 depth charges.

Career
Akigumo was an escort in the carrier fleet that carried out the 1941 attack on Pearl Harbor.

Shortly after the Battle of the Santa Cruz Islands during the early hours of 27 October 1942, Akigumo along with the destroyer  sank the heavily damaged and abandoned American aircraft carrier . US naval ships had attempted to scuttle Hornet earlier but failed to do so before Japanese naval forces forced the US ships to withdraw.

Akigumo served during the Pacific war in various theatres and by 1943/44 received the typical mid-war radar and AA refits, bringing the light AA outfit finally to four triple and one twin Type 96  mounts, plus some singles, and mounting both the active type 22 and the passive type E-27 radars.

Notes

References

External links
 CombinedFleet.com: Kagero-class destroyers
 CombinedFleet.com: Akigumo history

Kagerō-class destroyers
World War II destroyers of Japan
Attack on Pearl Harbor
Ships sunk by American submarines
Shipwrecks in the Philippine Sea
Maritime incidents in April 1944
1941 ships
Ships built by Uraga Dock Company